Scopula eleina is a moth of the  family Geometridae. It is found in Sulawesi.

References

Moths described in 1938
eleina
Moths of Indonesia